The Puerto Inca Province is the largest of eleven provinces of the Huánuco Region in Peru. The capital of this province is the city of Puerto Inca.

Boundaries
North: Ucayali Region
East: Ucayali Region
South: Pasco Region
West: Leoncio Prado Province

Languages
According to the 2007 census, Spanish was spoken by 89.5% of the population as their first language, while 5.5% spoke Quechua, 1.9% spoke Asháninka, 0.3% spoke Aymara, 2.6% spoke other indigenous languages and 0.0% spoke foreign languages. 

In the early 20th century, a number of Japanese migrated to the area and established the Kudo and Taba settlements for rice and coffee cultivation.

Political division
The province is divided into five districts:

 Codo del Pozuzo (Codo del Pozuzo)
 Honoria (Honoria)
 Puerto Inca
 Tournavista (Tournavista)
 Yuyapichis (Yuyapichis)

Places of interest
 El Sira Communal Reserve
 Mayantuyacu natural retreat
 Santuario Huishtin - traditional Amazonian Healing Centre and Nature Reserve

Notes 
A species of oribatid mite, Rhynchoppia puertoincaensis was discovered in Puerto Inca province and named after the area in 2017

References 

Provinces of the Huánuco Region